Mohammed Waad Abdulwahab Jadoua Al Bayati (born 18 September 1999) is an Iraqi-born Qatari footballer. He currently plays for Al-Sadd and the Qatar national football team. He is of Iraqi origin, but was naturalised and is currently representing Qatar.

He is the twin brother of Fahad Waad.

Honours
Al-Sadd
Qatar Stars League: 2020–2021
Qatar Cup: 2017, 2020, 2021
Emir of Qatar Cup: 2017, 2020, 2021
Qatari Stars Cup: 2019–2020

References

External links

 
 

1999 births
Qatari footballers
Qatari expatriate footballers
Living people
Twin sportspeople
Al Sadd SC players
Cultural Leonesa footballers
Al Ahli SC (Doha) players
Al-Wakrah SC players
Qatar Stars League players
Tercera División players
Naturalised citizens of Qatar
Qatari people of Iraqi descent
Iraqi emigrants to Qatar
Association football midfielders
Expatriate footballers in Spain
Qatari expatriate sportspeople in Spain
2021 CONCACAF Gold Cup players
Qatar under-20 international footballers
Qatar international footballers
2022 FIFA World Cup players